The Messenger is an album by American jazz saxophonist Ernest Dawkins' New Horizons Ensemble, which was recorded live at the Chicago's Velvet Lounge in 2005 and released on Delmark. The event was also filmed and issued on DVD.

Reception

In his review for AllMusic, Michael G. Nastos states "Blues, hard swing, and sounds from the black church and Africa all merge into a unified whole that is infectious, head-nodding, and smile-inducing."

The All About Jazz review by Nic Jones says "If these players are indeed looking towards new horizons, as the band's name suggests, then they're doing so from a vantage point rooted in the past, and their view of the past is of a worthwhile order."

In his review for JazzTimes Mike Shanley notes "Part oratory, part gutbucket excursion, 'Goin’ Downtown Blues' serves as the centerpiece of an enthralling live set."

Track listing
All compositions by Ernest Dawkins except as indicated
 "Intro" – 0:48
 "Mean Ameen" – 10:49
 "The Messenger" – 13:09
 "Goin' Downtown Blues" – 11:03
 "Toucouleur" – 11:21
 "The Brood" – 8:18 
 "Lookin' for Ninny" (Ameen Muhammad) – 8:25

Personnel
Ernest Dawkins - alto sax, tenor sax
Maurice Brown – trumpet
Steve Berry – trombone
Darius Savage – bass
Isaiah Spencer – drums

References

2006 live albums
Ernest Dawkins live albums
Delmark Records live albums